Live on Red Rocks is a double-CD live album released by O.A.R. on November 19, 2012.  The album was recorded at Red Rocks Amphitheatre in Morrison, CO on July 15, 2012.  The concert was released on full-length DVD on November 19, 2012, and on Blu-ray on March 19, 2013.  It is O.A.R.'s fifth released live album and twelfth released album overall.  This marks the first live release to feature part-time touring members Evan Oberla (trombone, vocals) and Jon Lampley (trumpet, vocals).

Track listing
Disc One
 "Dangerous Connection" - 6:53
 "Program Director" - 4:22
 "Shattered (Turn The Car Around)" - 5:27
 "Here's To You" - 5:35
 "Gotta Be Wrong Sometimes" - 4:38
 "Heard The World" - 5:13
 "Road Outside Columbus" - 7:55
 "Woke Up An Uncle" - 3:03
 "The Last Time" - 4:27
 "To Zion Goes I" - 4:32
 "The Wanderer" - 5:20
 "Delicate Few" - 8:40
Disc Two
 "Love And Memories" - 6:11
 "Mr. Moon" - 5:50
 "Heaven" - 4:33
 "Ladanday" - 6:51
 "Irish Rose" - 5:21
 "Black Rock" - 7:43
 "That Was a Crazy Game of Poker" - 13:30
 "I Feel Home" - 4:47
 "War Song" - 11:34
 "Hey Girl" - 6:57

References

O.A.R. albums
2012 live albums